Ivy to Roses is the debut mixtape by English singer and songwriter Mabel. It was originally released on 13 October 2017 through Polydor. This was followed by a reissue on 18 January 2019, with a new cover art and the inclusion of released material. The album's original release spawned one single, "Begging", while also including the top ten hit "Finders Keepers". The 2019 reissue spawned three singles; "Fine Line", "One Shot", and "Don’t Call Me Up", with the latter becoming her biggest hit to date, reaching three in the UK. The reissue also included the previously released featured singles "My Lover", "Cigarette", and "Ring Ring".

Singles

Original release 
The original release of Ivy to Roses features "Finders Keepers" and "Begging". The lead single, "Finders Keepers", was initially released on 26 May 2017, as part of her Bedroom EP. The song was released as a mainstream in August 2017, with an accompanying music video. In November 2017, the song impacted the UK Singles Chart, and was certified platinum. The song also charted in Ireland and Scotland. The second single, "Begging", was released shortly afterwards, but failed to chart.

Reissue 
The 2019 reissue of Ivy to Roses features six singles released subsequent to the original release. These include "My Lover" (with Not3s), "Fine Line" (featuring Not3s), "Cigarette" (with Raye and Stefflon Don), "Ring Ring" (with Jax Jones and Rich the Kid), "One Shot" and "Don’t Call Me Up". Following charting at 14 in the UK, "My Lover" was certified platinum. Mabel's other certifications also include "Fine Line" being gold, "Cigarette" being silver and "Ring Ring" being silver.

On 18 January 2019, "Don’t Call Me Up" was released as the next single from the mixtape, and debuted at 11 and later reaching a peak of 3 on the UK charts, as well as earning the number 1 spot on the UK Official Trending charts.

Track listing

Charts

Weekly charts

Year-end charts

Certifications

References

2017 mixtape albums
Polydor Records compilation albums
Mabel (singer) albums